The Imperial Valley ( or Valle Imperial) of Southern California lies in Imperial and Riverside counties, with an urban area centered on the city of El Centro. The Valley is bordered by the Colorado River to the east and, in part, the Salton Sea to the west. Farther west lies the San Diego and Imperial County border. To the north is the Coachella Valley region of Riverside County, which together with Imperial Valley form the Salton Trough, or the Cahuilla Basin, also the county line of Imperial and Riverside counties, and to the south the international boundary with Mexico.

The culture of the area blends those of the United States and Mexico, due to its regional history and geographic location along the international border. The Imperial Valley economy is based on agriculture.

Imperial Valley was named by the Imperial Land Company, in the hopes of attracting settlers. It is now the home of the El Centro metropolitan area and also an economic center of California's government defined "South Border". Locally, the terms "Imperial Valley" and "Imperial County" are used synonymously.

Geography

Part of a trough stretching from the Coachella Valley to the Gulf of California, it is almost entirely below sea level— below at the edge of the Salton Sea. Its hot desert climate is characterized by daily temperature extremes. It was once part of the Gulf of California, from which it was cut off by the dam-like deposits of the Colorado River Delta Fan as it carved out the Grand Canyon. Bordered by sand dunes and barren mountains, it was uninhabited until 1901, when the Imperial Canal was opened and diverted Colorado River water into the valley through Mexico. Floodwaters in 1905–07 destroyed the irrigation channels and created the Salton Sea now filled by the New River and irrigation run-off. The rivers in the southern part of the Salton Sea river basin flow south to north.

The valley is bordered by the Colorado River to the east and, in part, the Salton Sea to the west. Farther west lies the border with San Diego County and to the south the international boundary between the US state of California and Baja California, Mexico. To the north is the boundary with Riverside County and the Coachella Valley, which with the Imperial Valley form the "Cahuilla Basin" or the "Salton Trough".

El Centro is the largest industrial center of the Imperial Valley, being the center of shipping exports as well as being home to retail, transportation, wholesale, and agricultural industries. There are also two international border crossings nearby for commercial and noncommercial vehicles. The city's population was 37,835 at the 2000 census and 42,598 at the 2010 census. Fifty percent of the jobs in El Centro come from the service and retail sector.

Climate

During winter months the Valley averages more than eight hours of sunshine a day, receiving the most sunlight of any place in the United States.

The only recorded snowfall in the Valley occurred on December 12, 1932. Snow began falling at 8:45 p.m. and by 5 a.m. the next day  had been recorded. In the southwest portion of Imperial Valley,  of snow was reported that day. This was the only snowfall on record to cover the entire valley.

Regions
Imperial Valley can loosely categorize its cities and communities into three regions: the Salton Beach Towns, Desert Cities, and the El Centro area (urbanized Imperial). The Salton Sea Beach Towns have the smallest cities but were resorts in their heyday and have since shrunk in population and size due to the current state of the Salton Sea. The cities and communities of the desert region are outliers in that they are away from urbanized Imperial and tend to be smaller in population than the cities surrounding El Centro. Cities of the El Centro area tend to be larger than those of the desert and Salton regions. And the southeastern end of California is the state's poorest region with lower-income residents make up over half of the year-round population.

Imperial Valley cities

Cities over 10,000 population

 Brawley
 Calexico
 El Centro (county seat)
 Imperial

Cities under 10,000 population
 Calipatria
 Holtville
 Westmorland

Towns over 1,000 population

 Desert Shores
 Heber
 Niland
 Salton City
 Seeley

Towns under 1,000 population
 Bombay Beach
 Ocotillo
 Palo Verde
 Salton Sea Beach
 Winterhaven

Urban areas of the region
The El Centro, CA MSA is a multicore metropolitan region containing several urban areas.

Economy
Imperial County's economy consists predominantly of government, agriculture, and retail trade that represents approximately 70% of total county employment. Government services account for over one-third of total employment. Agriculture accounts for one-fourth of jobs with major crops of alfalfa, lettuce, sugar beets and carrots. Retail growth has been experienced due to increased population in the Imperial and Mexicali Valleys. In 2005, the Imperial Valley Mall opened, attracting shoppers from the Valley area, including residents and tourists across the border from Mexicali, greatly contributing to the county's retail sales.

Tourism

Tourism is considered the secondary industry of the Imperial Valley. Many visitors come to the area to visit the Salton Sea (California's largest inland lake, which serves as a dumpout point for the overflow and drainage from the IID canal system and ditch drainage) and the Algodones Dunes.  The New River and the Alamo River flow from the border city of Mexicali northward to the Salton Sea.

Another popular destination is the Salton Sea mud pots and volcanoes. These mud pots and volcanoes are in an open field on the eastern side of the Salton Sea. The mud is just above ambient temperature and you can walk right up to the vents. However, this is a natural system and temperatures will vary. Caution is advised. The location is host to a number of gray cones reaching heights of six feet (2 m) and depressions filled with bubbling mud. These features are the result of the geothermal activity in the area.

Off-roading on ATVs is another popular activity during the winter months. Heber Dunes State Vehicular Recreation Area is south of El Centro and is primarily an off-roading destination. The valley sand dune recreation area draws hundreds of thousands of off-road enthusiasts on good weekends. Bird-watching is a popular activity, with abundant natural habitat and rare species. The Imperial Valley has an array of excellent golf courses for all levels. Golf courses are in Holtville, Brawley and El Centro.

Sites of interest

Fort Yuma
Fort Yuma is on the banks of the Colorado River in Winterhaven, California. It was to defend the newly settled community of Yuma, Arizona on the other side of the Colorado River and the nearby Mexican border. In March 1851 the post was moved to a small elevation on the Colorado's west bank, opposite the present city of Yuma, Arizona, on the site of the former Mission Puerto de Purísima Concepción. This site had been occupied by Camp Calhoun, named for John C. Calhoun, established in 1849. Fort Yuma was established to protect the southern emigrant travel route to California and to attempt control of the warlike Yuma Indians in the surrounding  area.

Blue Angels
NAF El Centro is the winter home of the U.S. Navy Flight Demonstration Squadron, The Blue Angels.  NAF El Centro historically kicks off the Blue Angels' season with their first air show, traditionally held in March.

Imperial Valley Expo & Fairgrounds
The Imperial Valley Expo & Fairgrounds is home to the California Mid-Winter Fair and Fiesta, which is the local county fair. It is also home to the Imperial Valley Speedway, a   race track.

Algodones Sand Dunes
The name Algodones Dunes refers to the entire geographic feature, while the administrative designation for that portion managed by the Bureau of Land Management is the "Imperial Sand Dunes Recreation Area" (sometimes called the "Glamis Dunes"). The Algodones Sand Dunes are the largest mass of sand dunes in California. This dune system extends for more than  along the eastern edge of the Imperial Valley agricultural region in a band averaging  in width. A major east–west route of the Union Pacific railroad skirts the eastern edge. The dune system is divided into 3 areas. The northernmost area is known as Mammoth Wash. South of Mammoth Wash is the North Algodones Dunes Wilderness established by the 1994 California Desert Protection Act. This area is closed to motorized use and access is by hiking and horseback. The largest and most heavily used area begins at Highway 78 and continues south just past Interstate 8. The expansive dune formations offer picturesque scenery, a chance to view rare plants and animals, and a playground for ATV and off-roading enthusiasts. The dunes are also popular in film-making and have been the site for movies such as Return of the Jedi.

Salton Buttes
The Salton Buttes are volcanoes on the southern shores of the Salton Sea.

Colorado River

The Colorado River is a popular destination for water sports including fishing, boating, water-skiing, and jet-skiing. The natural course of the river flows from north of Grand Lake, Colorado into the Gulf of California. For many months out of the year, however, no water actually flows from the United States to the gulf, due to human consumption.

Salvation Mountain
Salvation Mountain (location ) is a colorful artificial mountain north of Calipatria, California, near Slab City.  It is made from adobe, straw, and thousands of gallons of paint.  It was created by Leonard Knight to convey the message that "God Loves Everyone".  Mr. Knight refused substantial donations of money and labor from supporters who wished to modify his message of universal love to favor or disfavor particular groups.

Anza-Borrego Desert State Park

Anza-Borrego Desert State Park, portions of which are in Imperial County, is the largest state park in California.  of dirt roads, 12 wilderness areas and miles of hiking trails provide visitors with an unparalleled opportunity to experience the wonders of the Colorado Desert. The park is named after Spanish explorer Juan Bautista de Anza and the Spanish name borrego, or bighorn sheep. The park features washes, wildflowers, palm groves, cacti and sweeping vistas. Visitors may also have the chance to see greater roadrunners, golden eagles, kit foxes, southern mule deer and Peninsular bighorn sheep, as well as desert iguanas, chuckwallas, and sidewinders.

Fossil Canyon and Painted Gorge
Fossil Canyon and the surrounding area near Ocotillo in the Coyote Mountains are great places for rock hounding and fossil hunting. The fossils here are not dinosaurs, but ancient shells, coral, and oysters from the Miocene epoch when the area was underwater.

The Painted Gorge, on the eastern side of the Coyote Mountains, consists of sedimentary, metamorphic and igneous rocks. Heat and movement over time has created fantastic shapes and colors. Oranges, reds, purples, and mauves mixed with browns and blacks create a palette of color as the sun illuminates and plays shadows upon this geologic wonder.

Imperial NWR

The Imperial National Wildlife Refuge protects wildlife habitat along  of the lower Colorado River in Arizona and California, including the last un-channeled section before the river enters Mexico. The river and its associated backwater lakes and wetlands are a green oasis, contrasting with the surrounding desert mountains. It is a refuge and breeding area for migratory birds and local desert wildlife.

Sonny Bono Salton Sea NWR

Because of its southern latitude, elevation and location in the Colorado Desert, the refuge experiences some of the highest temperatures in the nation. Daily temperatures from May to October generally exceed  with temperatures of  recorded yearly.

Mexicali
The border city of Mexicali, Baja California, Mexico, has museums, a zoo, a sports convention center, and an international airport. Visitors cross by foot or car from Calexico, California in the United States every day. Restaurants and taco stands, pharmacies, bars and dance clubs draw tourists. Many shops and stalls selling Mexican crafts and souvenirs within walking distance from the border. Also US residents get medical and dental services in Mexicali because they tend to be less expensive than those in the United States. Mexico's drinking age of 18 makes it a weekend destination for high school and college-aged Southern Californians.

Agriculture

Thousands of acres of prime farmland have transformed the desert into one of the most productive farming regions in California with an annual crop production of over $1 billion. Agriculture is the largest industry in the Imperial Valley and accounts for 48% of all employment. An environmental cost is that, south of the canal, the Colorado River no longer flows above ground at all for much of the year into Mexico. See Colorado River#Uncertain future.

A vast system of canals, check dams, and pipelines carry the water all over the valley, a system which forms the Imperial Irrigation District, or IID. The number of canal and pipeline branches number roughly over a hundred. Imported water and a long growing season allow two crop cycles each year, and the Imperial Valley is a major source of winter fruits and vegetables, cotton, and grain for U.S. and international markets. Alfalfa is another major crop produced in the Imperial Valley. The agricultural lands are served by a constructed agricultural drain system, which conveys surface runoff and subsurface drainage from fields to the Salton Sea, which is a designated repository for agricultural runoff, with environmental considerations not yet solved.

 All-American Canal
 All-American Canal Bridge
 Alamo Canal
 California Development Company
 Coachella Canal
 Imperial Irrigation District
 Imperial Land Company

Renewable energy

Imperial Valley has become a "hot-bed" of renewable energy projects, both solar and geothermal. This is driven in part by California's mandate to generate 33% of its electricity from renewable sources by 2020, the valley's excellent sun resources, the high unemployment, its proximity to large population centers on the coast, and large tracts of undeveloped desert land.

Much of the land suitable for green energy is owned by the federal government (Bureau of Land Management). Stirling Energy Systems is currently building one of the world's largest solar thermal plants,  with 38,000 "sun catchers," it will power up to 600,000 homes once it is fully operational by around 2015. CalEnergy runs a geothermal plant that generates 340 megawatts, enough power for 300,000 homes, and could tap into more for up to 2.5 million homes.

In addition, in 2012 Synthetic Genomics bought an 81 acre site in the Imperial Valley to produce algae fuel with their engineered algae strains, as well as other algae products such as food.

Demographics
The Imperial and Mexicali Valleys share a common international bond of both American and Hispanic cultures. On the U.S. side, the majority of residents are of Mexican-American or Latino heritage, while the Mexican side has been greatly influenced by American culture by the U.S. for many decades. The entire valley has multi-racial representation of Africans, Europeans, east and south Asians, and Native Americans.

The El Centro Metropolitan Area is home to 182,972 residents, according to a 2017 US Census estimate, and encompasses the whole Imperial County. The area is in the far southeast region of the State of California. Major population centers are Brawley, Calexico, and El Centro, which is the county seat.

As per the 2020 Census, Imperial County population was 179,702, an increase of 2.96% compared to 2010 population of 174,528. The population density was 41.8 people per square mile. The racial makeup of the county was 85% Hispanic or Latino, 3.3% black or African American, 2.5% Native American, 2.1% Asian, 0.2% Native Hawaiian or Pacific Islander, and 1.7% from two or more races. 65.7% spoke Spanish and 32.3% English as their first language.

There were 39,384 households, out of which 46.7% had children under the age of 18 living with them, 57.7% were married couples living together, 17.1% had a female householder with no husband present, and 20.1% were non-families. 17.1% of all households were made up of individuals, and 8.1% had someone living alone who was 65 years of age or older. The average household size was 3.33 and the average family size was 3.77. In the county the population was spread out, with 31.4% under the age of 18, 9.9% from 18 to 24, 30.4% from 25 to 44, 18.2% from 45 to 64, and 10.0% who were 65 years of age or older. The median age was 31 years. For every 100 females, there were 109.3 males. For every 100 females age 18 and over, there were 111.4 males.

Politics
Imperial County is a Democratic stronghold in Presidential, Congressional, and local elections. Republican George H. W. Bush won a majority in the 1988 United States presidential election.

On November 4, 2008, Imperial County voted 69.7% for Proposition 8, which amended the California Constitution to ban same-sex marriages, showing more support for the proposition than any other strongly Democratic county.

The median income for a household in the county was $31,870, and the median income for a family was $35,226. Males had a median income of $32,775 versus $23,974 for females. The per capita income for the county was $13,239. About 19.4% of families and 22.6% of the population were below the poverty line, including 28.7% of those under age 18 and 13.6% of those age 65 or over.

Education

Schools in the Imperial Valley

The Imperial Valley has many schools to offer education; high schools, middle/junior high schools, elementary schools, and colleges. Central Union High School, Southwest High School, Calexico High School, Holtville High School, Imperial High School, Calipatria High School, and Brawley Union High School are some of the high schools Imperial Valley has to offer. Imperial Valley College, in Imperial, and SDSU Imperial Valley Extension, in Calexico, are local. The valley also offers a partnership between the local community college, Imperial Valley College, and SDSU's extension which offers a four-year bachelor's degree for students in the area. The program was formally named imperial Valley Partnership University. This partnership was intended to provide students in the valley the opportunity to stay within the area while being able to acquire a bachelor's degree for an affordable price without having to transfer to a distant four-year university. The program hosted its first cohorts in the Fall of 2012 and since then has offered various academic programs such as Criminal Justice, History, Liberal Studies, Psychology, Public Administration, and Spanish. Imperial Valley University Program, respectably known as IVUP, has not only offered affordable education and the opportunity to stay local for students in the Imperial Valley, but it has also provided priority registration, scholarship opportunities, and the ability to use resources from both the IVC's and SDSU's campuses.

Transportation

Major highways

  Interstate 8
  State Route 7
  State Route 78
  State Route 86
  State Route 98
  State Route 111
  State Route 115

Public transportation
 Greyhound Lines
 Imperial Valley Transit
 Yuma County Area Transit
 Amtrak

Airports
Imperial County Airport is the main airport in the county. It is primarily a general aviation airport with limited commercial flight service. The major nearby airport is the San Diego International Airport.

In popular culture
Robert A. Heinlein's science fiction short story "Water Is for Washing" (Argosy, November 1947) was based on the premise that an earthquake had catastrophically shattered the range of deposits separating the Imperial Valley from the Gulf of California, precipitating a tidal wave moving north to transiently drown these lowlands. At the beginning of the story, Heinlein uses the character of a bartender in El Centro to establish the danger of the quake and inundation:

You've heard about the 1905 flood, when the Colorado River spilled over and formed the Salton Sea? But don't be too sure about quakes; valleys below sea level don't just grow—something has to cause them. The San Andreas Fault curls around this valley like a question mark. Just imagine the shake-up it must have taken to drop thousands of square miles below the level of the Pacific.

Due to its desert environment and proximity to Los Angeles, California, movies are sometimes filmed in the sand dunes outside the agricultural portions of the Imperial Valley. These have included:

 American Sniper
 Return of the Jedi
 Independence Day
 Stargate
 The Scorpion King
 Patriot Games
 Into the Wild
 The Men who Stare at Goats
 La Bamba
 The original Flight of the Phoenix (1965) was filmed outside of Holtville.
 The Tom Cruise movie Losin' It (1983) was filmed in Calexico.
 Wake Island (1942). Most of the movie's outside scenes were filmed at Salton Sea Lake in the Imperial Valley of California.

Additionally, portions of the 2005 film Jarhead were filmed here because of its similarity to the desert terrain of Iraq.

Notable people
 Cher, entertainer
 Royce Freeman, NFL Running Back
 Edith Summers Kelley, author
 Mike Mohamed, NFL linebacker
 Sergio Romo, MLB pitcher
 Rudy Seánez, former MLB pitcher
 Robert Thomas, NFL linebacker
 Andy Ruiz Jr., Boxing Heavyweight Champion

See also
 Niland Geyser
1940 El Centro earthquake
 1979 Imperial Valley earthquake
 Imperial Valley Press
 O. M. Wozencraft – "Father of the Imperial Valley"

References

Further reading

 Benny J. Andrés, Jr. Power and Control in the Imperial Valley: Nature, Agribusiness, and Workers in the California Borderland, 1900–1940. College Station, TX: Texas A&M University Press, 2014.

External links

 Imperial Valley Economic Development Corporation
 City of El Centro Website
 City of Imperial Website
 From the Colorado River to the Salton Sea: The story of Imperial Valley's Water (slideshow)
 

 
Valleys of Imperial County, California
Geography of the Colorado Desert
California Enterprise Zones
Coachella Valley
Colorado River
Lower Colorado River Valley
Valleys of California
Regions of California
Salton Trough
Southern California